Emerson Lake is a dry lake bed  in the Mojave Desert of San Bernardino County, California,  northeast of Joshua Tree.

Emerson Lake is on federal lands within the borders of the Marine Corps Air Ground Combat Center Twentynine Palms, west of Hildago Mountain.

See also
 List of lakes in California

References

External links
 Satellite Photo (Google Maps)

Endorheic lakes of California
Lakes of the Mojave Desert
Lakes of San Bernardino County, California
Lakes of California
Lakes of Southern California